Disney Star Chinese Movies is a Chinese language pay television channel owned by Disney Networks Group Pacific Ltd. It features Chinese films, featuring famous actors such as Bruce Lee, Jackie Chan, Chow Yun-fat, Michelle Yeoh, Andy Lau, Sammi Cheng, Stephen Chow and many more.

The channel mainly broadcasts Hong Kong-produced films and Chinese films (including Chinese films, Taiwanese films, Singapore films, and Malaysian films), as well as bilingual Japanese films, Japanese animations (strip TV series and theatrical versions), Korean films, Thai films, etc., and will digitally restore some Hong Kong action films.

On April 29, 2017, Star Chinese Movies provided bilingual services, and most of the movies were broadcast in Mandarin and original sound at the same time.

Some time periods have added animation periods. The Taiwan version mainly broadcasts Japanese animations, while the Southeast Asian version broadcasts Chinese domestic animations. It is broadcast every day: Taiwan version: 19:00-21:00, Southeast Asia version: 16:30-19:00.

In addition, they also obtained the pay TV broadcasting rights of the Hong Kong Film Awards and the Golden Horse Awards for the Hong Kong, Macau and Southeast Asia (except Singapore and Malaysia, in which sold to their local broadcaster).

History
It was launched on 1 May 1994 as Star Mandarin Movies. At that time, it screened both Hollywood and Chinese-language films and was focused to a pan-Asian audience split into two television channels: Star Movies International (now Fox Movies) and Star Mandarin Movies (now Star Chinese Movies).

On 15 December 2007, a sister channel named Star Chinese Movies 2 was launched, the HD and VOD channels launched 3 years later.

On 19 May 2012, the Star Chinese Movies 2 and Hong Kong was officially rebranded as Star Chinese Movies Legend. The channel logo was also changed from a star, to a stylized crown.

On 1 October 2021, Star Chinese Movies Legend along with most of Fox Networks Asia channels (except National Geographic Asia and National Geographic Wild Asia) end all operations from 1 October 2021 with the very final and last Raymond Wong Pak-ming movie aired is Happy Ghost III. After final and last Raymond Wong Pak-ming showing the message with Chinese (本頻道將不再提供服務感謝您長期支持與收看; pinyin: Běn píndào jiāng bù zài tígōng fúwù gǎnxiè nín chángqí zhīchí yú shōukàn; lit.: This channel is no longer available, thank you for watching.). All these channels shows moved to Disney+ (in Singapore, Philippines, Hong Kong and Taiwan) and Disney+ Hotstar (in Southeast Asia outside Singapore and Philippines), however, Star Chinese Movies continues to operate at this date.

Feeds
 Taiwan
 Hong Kong (Closed on 1 October 2021 for SCM Legend)
 Singapore
 Southeast Asia (Closed on 1 October 2021 for SCM Legend) 
 Middle East
 Malaysia (Closed on 1 October 2021)

References

External links
 STAR Chinese Movies Taiwan
 STAR Chinese Movies HD Taiwan
 STAR Chinese Movies Hong Kong
 STAR Chinese Movies Hong Kong at www..com

Television networks in China
Movie channels in Hong Kong
Movie channels in Singapore
Movie channels in Taiwan
Television channels and stations established in 1994
Disney television networks